Nzé may refer to:

 Pierre Nzé, a Congolese politician and diplomat
 Selim Haroun Nzé, an Algerian-Gabonese footballer

See also
 Nze (disambiguation)
 N'Ze (disambiguation)
 NZE (disambiguation)